is a video game developed and published by Capcom for the Dreamcast and arcade. It is based on the comic book character Spawn created by Todd McFarlane and produced by Image Comics. A port was planned for the PlayStation 2 as a launch title but was later canceled.

Storyline
Al Simmons was a military operative who was murdered by his superior, Jason Wynn, then sent to Hell for his previous work as an assassin. Five years after his death, Simmons makes a deal with the demon Malebolgia to resurrect him from death as a hellspawn so that he could see his wife, Wanda, again. However, he soon finds out that his wife, in the five years that he was dead, had married his best friend, Terry Fitzgerald.

Gameplay
This game includes three modes:
 Boss Rush Mode - The main mode of the game. Players must defeat bosses in each stage within the time limit to earn points. 
 Team Battle Mode - Players must defeat the opponent team to win.
 Battle Royale - Players must defeat all enemies to win.

The game features thirty-seven playable characters overall, including eleven main playable characters from the arcade release as well as multiple hidden characters.

Reception

The Dreamcast version received "mixed" reviews according to video game review aggregator Metacritic. It is judged as the best Spawn game, although it did not achieve high rates in GameSpot and IGN, especially due to camera and AI problems. Greg Orlando of NextGen gave it a negative review, saying, "Lack of decorum only allows us to comment that this game would more aptly be subtitled 'From Capcom's Rectum.'" In Japan, however, Famitsu gave it a score of 31 out of 40.

Trivia
The Dreamcast version cover art and the Japanese marquee for In the Demon's Hand is taken from Spawn #95. The marquee of the game is taken from the U.S. limited edition Spawn soundtrack.

Notes

References

External links

Spawn: In the Demon's Hand entry at the Spawn official website

1999 video games
Arcade video games
Capcom games
Cancelled PlayStation 2 games
Dreamcast games
Eidos Interactive games
Superhero video games
Video games about demons
Video games based on Spawn (comics)
Video games developed in Japan